Gerald "Gerry" M. Cordle (born 29 September 1960) is a Welsh former rugby union, and professional rugby league footballer who played in the 1980s and 1990s.

Playing career

International honours
Gerald Cordle won caps for Wales (RL) while at Bradford Northern in 1992 against France (interchange/substitute), and England, in 1993 against New Zealand, in 1994 against France, and Australia (interchange/substitute), in 1996 against France, and won a cap for Great Britain (RL) while at Bradford Northern in 1990 against France.

County Cup Final appearances
Gerald Cordle played  and scored two tries in Bradford Northern's 20–14 victory over Featherstone Rovers in the 1989 Yorkshire Cup Final during the 1989–90 season at Headingley, Leeds on Sunday 5 November 1989.

Regal Trophy Final appearances
Gerald Cordle played  in Bradford Northern's 2–12 defeat by Warrington in the 1990–91 Regal Trophy Final during the 1990–91 season at Headingley, Leeds on Saturday 12 January 1991.

References

External links
!Great Britain Statistics at englandrl.co.uk (statistics currently missing due to not having appeared for both Great Britain, and England)
Photograph 'Gerald Cordle goes on the outside' at rlhp.co.uk

1960 births
Living people
Bradford Bulls players
Cardiff RFC players
Footballers who switched code
Great Britain national rugby league team players
Rugby league players from Cardiff
Rugby league wingers
Rugby union players from Cardiff
Rugby union wings
South Wales RLFC (1995) players
Wales national rugby league team players
Welsh rugby league players
Welsh rugby union players